

Medalists

60 metres

Long Jump

Shot Put

High Jump

60 metres Hurdles

Pole Vault

1,000 metres

Summary

Combined events at the World Athletics Indoor Championships
Heptathlon